William Cookson may refer to:
 William Cookson (poet)
 William Cookson (cricketer)
 William Cookson (priest)
 Bill Cookson, Australian rules footballer